The Frumoasa is a left tributary of the river Racul in Romania. It discharges into the Racul in Gârciu. The Frumoasa Dam is located on this river.

References

Rivers of Romania
Rivers of Harghita County